Doctors' Wives is a 1931 American pre-Code romantic drama film made by Fox Film Corporation, directed by Frank Borzage. The film stars Warner Baxter and Joan Bennett.  The screenplay was written by Maurine Dallas Watkins, based on a novel by Henry and Sylvia Lieferant.

Cast
 Warner Baxter as  Dr. Judson Penning 
 Joan Bennett as  Nina Wyndram 
 Victor Varconi as  Dr. Kane Ruyter 
 Cecilia Loftus as  Aunt Amelia 
 Paul Porcasi as  Dr. Calucci 
 Minna Gombell as  Julia Wyndram 
 Helene Millard as  Vivian Crosby 
 John St. Polis as  Dr. Mark Wyndram 
 George Chandler as  Dr. Roberts 
 Violet Dunn as  Lou Roberts 
 Ruth Warren as  Charlotte 
 Louise Mackintosh as Mrs. Kent 
 William Maddox as  Rudie

External links
 
 
 
 

1931 films
1931 romantic drama films
American black-and-white films
Films based on American novels
American romantic drama films
Fox Film films
Films directed by Frank Borzage
1930s American films
Silent romantic drama films